HTML Components (HTCs) are a legacy technology used to implement components in script as Dynamic HTML (DHTML) "behaviors" in the Microsoft Internet Explorer web browser. Such files typically use an .htc extension and the "text/x-component" MIME type.

An HTC is typically an HTML file (with JScript / VBScript) and a set of elements that define the component. This helps to organize behavior encapsulated in script modules that can be attached to parts of a Webpage DOM.

Example
<body>
<ul>
  <li style="behavior:url(hilite.htc)">Example</li>
</ul>
</body>

In this example, the li element is given the behavior defined by "hilite.htc" (a file that contains JScript code defining highlight/lowlight actions on mouse over). The same hilite.htc can then be given to any element in the HTML page - thus encapsulating the behavior defined by this file.

See also
EMML (Motorola)

References

External links
 Using HTML Components to Implement DHTML Behaviors in Script
 W3C Note on HTML Components
 Using cross-browser HTML Components 
 Converting HTC behaviors to cross browser Javascript 

Internet Explorer